The Southern Punjab cricket team was an Indian domestic team representing the southern part of the Indian state of Punjab during the time of the British Raj and later the southern part of its Indian successor, following the partition of India.

History
The team first played first-class cricket in 1926 against a touring Marylebone Cricket Club team. Southern Punjab was one of the teams that competed in the inaugural season of the Ranji Trophy in 1934-35, and it continued to contest the Ranji Trophy until 1951-52. It returned in 1959-60 and continued until 1967-68, after which it combined with Northern Punjab to form Punjab. Its final first-class match was a draw against Northern Punjab.

Southern Punjab’s highest finish in the Ranji Trophy came in 1938-39 when it lost to Bombay in the final. Most of Southern Punjab's home games were played at the Baradari Ground (now known as Dhruve Pandove Stadium) in Patiala.

Honours
 Ranji Trophy
 Runners-up (1): 1938–39

Notable players

See also
 Patiala cricket team
 Eastern Punjab cricket team
 Northern Punjab cricket team

References

External links
Matches played by Southern Punjab cricket team at CricketArchive

Indian first-class cricket teams
Former senior cricket clubs of India
Cricket in Punjab, India
Cricket clubs established in 1926
1926 establishments in India
1967 disestablishments in India